Tomás Blanco García (10 November 1910 – 16 July 1990) was a Spanish film actor. He appeared in more than 140 films between 1942 and 1983. He was born in Bilbao, Spain and died in Madrid, Spain.

Selected filmography

 A Famous Gentleman (1943) – Don Álvaro
 Mariona Rebull (1947) – Ernesto Villar
 Nada (1947) – Juan Brunet
 Four Women (1947) – soldado enamorado de Blanca
 Amanhã Como Hoje (1948) – Arturo
 Guest of Darkness (1948) – Míster Arlen
 Las aguas bajan negras (1948) – Sergio, el pagador
 El verdugo (1948)
 Just Any Woman (1949) – Marido de Nieves (uncredited)
 Wings of Youth (1949) – Capitán Rueda
 El santuario no se rinde (1949) – Capitán Cortés
 Pequeñeces... (1950)
 The Troublemaker (1950) – Don Leo
 Tempestad en el alma (1950)
 I'm Not Mata Hari (1950) – Richard disfrazado (uncredited)
 El pasado amenaza (1950)
 Apartado de correos 1001 (1950) – Antonio Benítez
 La fuente enterrada (1950) – Raúl
 El señorito Octavio (1950) – Carlos
 The Floor Burns (1952) – Rafael
 The Call of Africa (1952) – Alfajeme
 La Laguna Negra (1952) – Juan
 Pasaporte para un ángel (Órdenes secretas) (1954)
 La patrulla (1954) – El Señorito
 Los Hermanos corsos (1955)
 La cigüeña dijo sí (1955)
 Sangre y acero (1956)
 Faustina (1957) – Don José
 The Violet Seller (1958) – Alfonso
 Héroes del Aire (1958) – Ernesto
 Rapsodia de sangre (1958) – Ronzi
 Where Are You Going, Alfonso XII? (1959) – Duque de Sesto
 S.O.S., abuelita (1959)
 Legions of the Nile (1959) – Ovidio
 Pescando millones (1959)
 La fiel infantería (1960) – Coronel
 El amor que yo te di (1960) – Joven
 El hombre que perdió el tren (1960)
 Juanito (1960)
 The Little Colonel (1960) – Don Martín Alvear
 Alfonso XII and María Cristina (1960) – Don José Osorio, duque de Sesto
 One Step Forward (1960)
 La paz empieza nunca (1960)
 Ursus (1961)
 Revolt of the Mercenaries (1961) – Capitano Brann
 The Invincible Gladiator (1961) – Senior Conspirator
 Darling (1961) – Minister
 Madame (1961) – Le maréchal Augereau (uncredited)
 Los culpables (1962) – Pablo Ibáñez
 Cupido contrabandista (1962) – Jefe de la banda
 Rogelia (1962) – Capitán de Regulares
 Occidente y sabotaje (1962)
 El valle de las espadas (1963) – Don Nuño
 La pandilla de los once (1963) – Al Gómez
 Noches de Casablanca (1963) – André (uncredited)
 Gli invincibili sette (1963) – Panuzio
 The Secret of the Black Widow (1963) – (uncredited)
 The Troublemaker (1963) – Don Leo
 Pacto de silencio (1963) – Ministerio fiscal
 Heroes of the West (1964) – Mayor Ortes
 Fuera de la ley (1964)
 Black Angel of the Mississippi (1964) – Burton
 Alféreces provisionales (1964) – Capitán de la Academia
 Un tiro por la espalda (1964)
 El señor de La Salle (1964) – Tío de La Salle
 El salario del crimen (1965) – Sáez – el cajero
 Television Stories (1965) – Ricardo Elósegui
 Heroes of Fort Worth (1965) – Confederate General
 Los cuatreros (1965) – Coronel
 Más bonita que ninguna (1965) – Nemesio Ordóñez
 Espionage in Tangier (1965) – Professor Greff
 Agent 077: Mission Bloody Mary (1965)
 Muere una mujer (1965) – Juan de la Peña
 Agent 077 From the Orient with Fury (1965) – Auctioneer
 Mi canción es para ti (1965) – (uncredited)
 For a Few Dollars More (1965) – Tucumcari sheriff
 Posición avanzada (1966) – Comandante
 Special Mission Lady Chaplin (1966) – Commissario Soler
 The Sea Pirate (1966) – Le gouverneur Malartic
 Tonnerre sur l'océan Indien (1966) – Le gouverneur Malartic
 Querido profesor (1966)
 Fantasía... 3 (1966) – Diablo (segment "Los tres pelos del diablo")
 El hombre que mató a Billy el Niño (1967) – Peter – Helen's Uncle
 Le canard en fer blanc (1967) – (uncredited)
 Las cicatrices (1967) – Gabriel Segura
 Operation Delilah (1967) – Embajador inglés
 Operación cabaretera (1967) – Alejandro
 Pero... ¿en qué país vivimos? (1967) – Comisario
 15 Scaffolds for a Murderer (1967) – Clark Benett
 Love in Flight (1967) – El Coronel
 Superargo and the Faceless Giants (1968) – Davies
 Agonizando en el crimen (1968) – Padre de Jean
 I Want Him Dead (1968) – Mac (uncredited)
 Los que tocan el piano (1968) – Don Aurelio
 El secreto del capitán O'Hara (1968) – Coronel Robert Patterson
 La dinamita está servida (1968) – Pablo
 1001 Nights (1968) – Cassim
 Soltera y madre en la vida (1969) – Don Anselmo 'Patito'
 Juicio de faldas (1969) – Don Gonzalo Carranza
 I Must Abandon You (1969) – Bellini
 Tengo que abandonarte (1969)
 Susana (1969) – Don Adolfo
 Con ella llegó el amor (1970)
 The House That Screamed (1970) – Pedro Baldié
 The Locket (1970)
 The Complete Idiot (1970) – Basilio
 El último día de la guerra (1970) – Martin Truppe
 Los hombres las prefieren viudas (1970) – Detective privado
 Don Erre que erre (1970) – Don Tomás Briceño
 La orilla (1971) – Don Senén
 Las amantes del diablo (1971) – Dr. Donati
 Los corsarios (1971)
 Una chica casi decente (1971) – Inspector Ortiz
 Su le mani, cadavere! Sei in arresto (1971) – Mr. Carson
 La montaña rebelde (1971) – Don Alejandro
 Nothing Less Than a Real Man (1972) – Víctor Yáñez, padre de Julia
 Naked Girl Killed in the Park (1972) – Insurance Company Boss (uncredited)
 ¡Qué noche de bodas, chicas! (1972)
 Ricco the Mean Machine (1973)
 Vida conyugal sana (1974) – Zariquiegui
 Proceso a Jesús (1974) – Interprete de Caifás
 The King is the Best Mayor (1974) – Alcalde
 Solo ante el Streaking (1975) – Decano
 Adulterio a la española (1976) – Don Antonio
 El caballero de la mano en el pecho (1976)
 Batida de raposas (1976) – Jugador de póker
 Father Cami's Wedding (1979)
 The Autonomines (1983) – Embajador vasco

External links

1910 births
1990 deaths
Spanish male film actors
People from Bilbao
Male actors from the Basque Country (autonomous community)
20th-century Spanish male actors
Male Spaghetti Western actors